Heo Sol-ji (Hangul: 허솔지; born January 10, 1989), known mononymously as Solji, is a South Korean singer. She was a member of the ballad duo group 2NB from 2006 to 2010. She later became a vocal trainer before joining EXID in July 2012 as the leader and main vocalist.

Career
Solji was formerly a member of the vocal duo 2NB with Blady's Gabin, and released solo singles in 2008. The duo disbanded in 2012. She then worked as EXID's vocal trainer before becoming a member. In April 2012, AB Entertainment announced that three original members Yuji, Dami, and Haeryeong would leave the girl group EXID. Solji then joined EXID along with Hyelin, a former Superstar K3 participant.

In February 2013, EXID formed a sub-unit called "Dasoni", which consisted of Solji and Hani. The sub-unit released their debut single "Goodbye" on February 15, 2013, which also included the song "Said So Often".

In February 2015, Solji participated in a singing competition program, MBC's King of Mask Singer, for their pilot episode, in which she won the title. She appeared as Self-Luminous Mosaic and defeated singer and comedian, Shin Bora, and trot singer, Hong Jin-young, and became the first winner of the show, impressing the panel of judges as well as viewers. This drew a lot of attention to EXID and boosted Solji's reputation as a talented vocalist.

On February 8, 2016, Solji, as well as fellow vocal trainer and friend, Doo Jin-Soo, were invited to join MBC's Duet Song Festival for the pilot episode of their Lunar New Year Special. They went up against Block B's rapper Zico and his partner, Lee So-young. Solji and her partner emotionally sang Lee Seung-cheol's "The Sky in the West (서쪽하늘)". In the end, Solji and Doo Jin-soo won with a score of 477, which is still the highest score in the episode, and impressed the judges and the viewers yet again. On April 8, 2016, Solji and her partner were invited back to compete in MBC's Duet Song Festival for their first episode. They were the last performers to sing in the episode thus competing with f(x)'s Luna and Goo Hyun-mo. Solji sang Davichi's "8282". In the end, Solji won again with a score of 439 and thus further increasing EXID's popularity and her reputation as a singer.

On December 21, 2016, Solji was diagnosed with hyperthyroidism, putting her career on hold, while the other four members of EXID continued their schedules in the year-end awards season. She made a surprise appearance in EXID's Asia Tour in Seoul on 13 August 2017, but she was still not medically cleared to return to group activities. She, however, participated in recording for the group's fourth mini-album, Full Moon, despite not being involved in its promotion and live performances. She also stayed active as a Radio DJ. On July 4, 2018, Solji revealed that her condition has stabilized enough to prepare for her return for EXID's next comeback. On July 27, it was confirmed by the agency that she would be back for EXID's Japanese debut.

From July 22-October 23, 2018, she competed and defended her title as King of Masked Singer 5 more times. With her wins, she became the only person to had won the title under both incarnations.  
 
On February 5, 2020, Solji left Banana Culture although she remains as a member of EXID in the future activities.

On March 23, 2020, Solji signed with C-JeS Entertainment to pursue her solo career.

In 2022, Solji made a comeback with her first mini album First Letter on February 25.On November 21, 2022, Solji released a single album, The days we were us.

Personal life 
Solji majored in Applied Music at Dong-ah Institute of Media and Arts. In December 2016, she was diagnosed with hyperthyroidism and went on hiatus from EXID's group activities until July 2018. She also enrolled in Kyung Hee Cyber University to study the practical music program during her hiatus time (2017).

In October 2021, Solji was appointed as a professor in the Department of Applied Music at Yongin University.

Discography

Extended plays

Single albums

Singles

Filmography

Television shows

Radio shows

Theatre

References

External links

 Official EXID website

1989 births
Living people
K-pop singers
South Korean women pop singers
South Korean contemporary R&B singers
South Korean dance musicians
Mandarin-language singers of South Korea
EXID members
South Korean female idols